Niotaze Methodist Episcopal Church (also known as Odell Memorial Methodist Episcopal Church and as Niotaze United Methodist Church) is a historic church at 301 N. F Street in Niotaze, Kansas.  It was designed by the noted church architect Benjamin D. Price, was built in about 1895.  It was added to the National Register in 2006.

It is a one-story  one-room front-gabled church.  It is built of rusticated sandstone blocks on a sandstone foundation.

References

External links

Methodist churches in Kansas
Churches on the National Register of Historic Places in Kansas
Churches completed in 1895
Buildings and structures in Chautauqua County, Kansas
National Register of Historic Places in Chautauqua County, Kansas